The 12th Racquetball World Championships were held in Anyang (South Korea) from July 30 to August 7, 2004, with players from 17 different countries. The USA swept the gold medals, winning both singles and doubles in the Men’s and Women’s competitions as well as both Men’s and Women’s team competitions. 

Jack Huczek of the USA won Men’s Singles for the 2nd time, successfully defending the title he won in 2002. Cheryl Gudinas of the USA won her 3rd straight Women’s Singles title. 

In doubles, the USA’s Jackie Paraiso and Kim Russell successfully defended their Women’s Doubles title. The win was the third consecutive for Russell, who won with Kersten Hallander in 2000. Paraiso’s win was her 6th Women’s Doubles World Championship. Their team-mates, Mike Dennison and Shane Vanderson both won for the first time in Men’s Doubles.

Medal table

Men's team competition

Women's team competition

Men's Singles

Women's Singles

Men’s Doubles

Women's Doubles

See also
Racquetball World Championships

References

External links
 IRF website

Racquetball World Championships
Racquetball
Racquetball in South Korea
International sports competitions hosted by South Korea
2004 in South Korean sport